Miastków Kościelny  is a village in Garwolin County, Masovian Voivodeship, in east-central Poland. It is the seat of the gmina (administrative district) called Gmina Miastków Kościelny.

The village has a population of 630.

References

Villages in Garwolin County